Stranahan may refer to:

Clara Harrison Stranahan (1831 – 1905), American author
Farrand Stewart Stranahan (1842–1904), American Civil War veteran, railroad executive, banker, and Republican U.S. politician
Frank Stranahan (1922–2013), amateur golf champion
James S. T. Stranahan (1808–1898), United States Representative from New York
Lee Stranahan, former reporter for Breitbart News, Radio Sputnik broadcaster 
Nevada Stranahan (1861–1928), Collector of the Port of New York
R. A. Stranahan Arboretum,  in Toledo, Ohio, USA, containing 1500 trees from USA, China, Serbia, Japan, and Norway
Stranahan High School, high school located in Ft. Lauderdale, Florida
Stranahan House, historic home in Fort Lauderdale, Florida, United States
Stranahan Theater, 2,424-seat concert hall located in Toledo, Ohio, USA
Stranahan's Colorado Whiskey, 94 proof, small-batch whiskey distilled in Denver, Colorado
David Stanley Stranahan (1954-current), all around nice guy, Grandview, Washington